Pogost is a rural locality (a village) in Seletskoye Rural Settlement of Kholmogorsky District, Arkhangelsk Oblast, Russia. The population was 464 as of 2010.

Geography 
It is located 145 km from Kholmogory.

References 

Rural localities in Kholmogorsky District
Kholmogorsky Uyezd